Into, entering or changing form, may also refer to:
 INTO University Partnerships, a British business
 Into (album), an album by the Rasmus
 Into (magazine), a digital magazine owned by Grindr
 Into, a male Finnish name
 Irish National Teachers' Organisation

Mathematics
 Into, referring to mathematical functions, taking distinct arguments to distinct values (injective)
 Into, used as a multiplier in mathematical jargon in Indian English (3 into 3 = 9)

See also